Maxime Comtois (born January 8, 1999) is a Canadian professional ice hockey left winger for the  Anaheim Ducks of the National Hockey League (NHL).

Playing career
Comtois was drafted by the Victoriaville Tigres third overall in the 2015 QMJHL Entry Draft. On June 24, 2017, Comtois was selected in the second round, 50th overall by the Anaheim Ducks in the 2017 NHL Entry Draft. He signed a three-year entry-level contract with the Ducks on March 3, 2018.

Comtois made the Ducks' 2018 opening night roster out of training camp. On October 3, 2018, he made his professional debut in the Ducks' 2018–19 season opener in San Jose and scored his first professional goal in the first minute of the game, on his first shot attempt at goaltender Martin Jones. The Ducks went on to win the game 5–2. Comtois contributed to be amongst the Ducks scoring leaders to start the season, scoring 7 points in his first 10 games before suffering an injury. On his return he was assigned to AHL affiliate, the San Diego Gulls, before he was returned to his junior club, the Drummondville Voltigeurs of the Quebec Major Junior Hockey League (QMJHL) on November 24, 2018.

International play

 

On December 25, 2018, Comtois was named captain for Canada national junior team while they competed at the 2019 World Junior Ice Hockey Championships. He is the only player to return from the 2018 gold medal-winning team. On December 26, Comtois scored four goals in a 14–0 win over Denmark national junior team in the first game of the tournament. Comtois became the fifth player from Team Canada to score four goals in a World Juniors game, with the last being Taylor Raddysh in 2017. After Canada was eliminated from the tournament, Comtois revealed he had been playing with a separated shoulder.

Career statistics

Regular season and playoffs

International

References

External links
 

1999 births
Canadian ice hockey left wingers
Anaheim Ducks draft picks
Anaheim Ducks players
Drummondville Voltigeurs players
Ice hockey people from Quebec
Living people
Sportspeople from Longueuil
San Diego Gulls (AHL) players
Victoriaville Tigres players